Elena Maire Karin Leeve (born 1 February 1983 in Helsinki) is a Finnish actress who has worked on television, in films and on stage. She received a Jussi Award as the Best Leading Actress for her work in a Pirjo Honkasalo film Fire-Eater in 1999. In 2009, she won her second Jussi for the leading role in a film Putoavia enkeleitä.

Selected filmography

Fire-Eater (1998)
Cyclomania (2001)
Beauty and the Bastard (2005)
Ganes (2007)
Putoavia enkeleitä (2008)
Risto (2011)
August Fools (2013)

References

External links

1983 births
Living people
Actresses from Helsinki
20th-century Finnish actresses
Finnish film actresses
Finnish television actresses
21st-century Finnish actresses